Zitlala  is one of the 81 municipalities of Guerrero, in south-western Mexico. The municipal seat lies at Zitlala.  The municipality covers an area of 308.2 km².

In 2005, the municipality had a total population of 19,718.

The municipality has been impacted by violence.

References

Municipalities of Guerrero